Shaler Area High School is a high school in Shaler Township, Pennsylvania (with a Pittsburgh mailing address). The school employed 124 teachers yielding a student teacher ratio of 1:14. The students' Race/Ethnicity breakdown was: 1,750 Caucasian, 6 Hispanic, 27 Black, 7 Asian Pacific Islander.

History
Shaler Area High School was established in 1971 from the court-ordered merger of Etna borough, Reserve Township, Millvale borough, and Shaler Township high schools. The current building was constructed during 1978 and 1979.

In 2006, the school board approved a plan to regroup grades within its schools, including moving ninth grade students to the high school. $30 million in renovations were budgeted to create space for classrooms and to enlarge other school facilities.

Notable alumni

Anne Brodsky (class of 1983), author
Tom Corbett (class of 1964), former Republican Attorney General (2005-2011) and Governor of Pennsylvania (2011-2015).
Gaelen Foley, New York Times Bestselling romance novelist
Danny Fortson (class of 1994), professional basketball player
Art Howe, professional baseball player, manager and coach 
Ken Karcher (class of 1981), professional football player
Mark Madden (class of 1978), Radio personality
Steve Sciullo, former professional football player
Ian Terry (Class of 2009), Big Brother 14 winner
J. P. Holtz (Class of 2012), Current Tight End in the National Football League for the New Orleans Saints.

References

External links
Shaler Area High School official website

Educational institutions established in 1971
Public high schools in Pennsylvania
Education in Pittsburgh area
Schools in Allegheny County, Pennsylvania
1971 establishments in Pennsylvania